This is the discography of R&B and soul quartet 112.

Albums

Studio albums

Extended plays

Singles

As lead artist

As featured performer

Collaborations

Guest vocals
 Key:
 BGVs – Background vocals
 K – Keyboards

Production and writing
 Key:
 BGVs - Background vocals
 W/CW - Writer/Co-Writer
 P - Producer

References

Contemporary R&B discographies
Discographies of American artists
Discography